Bofors 120 mm Automatic Gun L/46, most commonly referred to as either Bofors FAK 120 or Bofors TAK 120 depending on the configuration (field gun vs naval gun), was a Swedish liquid-cooled single-barreled  caliber long-range anti-aircraft autocannon designed by Bofors during the 1950s for indigenous use and export.

It was produced in two different variants during the 1950s and 1960s respectively, a field variant and a naval variant, and the latter still being in service today with the Indonesian Navy.

Variants 
The Bofors 120 mm Automatic Gun L/46 was throughout its product life produced in two different main-variants, a field version named FAK 120 and a naval version named TAK 120.

Bofors FAK 120 

The , also sold under the name , but most commonly known as the FAK 120, was the initial variant of the Bofors 120 mm Automatic Gun L/46. It was developed during the 1950's to meet a request from the Swedish Army for a new long range anti-aircraft gun capable of engaging aircraft at high altitude with a high rate of fire. This request lead to a  caliber fully automatic medium-high velocity gun with a high capacity magazine and a high rate of fire, mounted on a field carriage.

The initial plan was to acquire 6 guns for trial, only one prototype was produced. The prototype was designated 12 cm luftvärnsautomatkanon försöksmodell 1 (12 cm lvakan fm 1), meaning 12 cm automatic anti-aircraft gun trial-model 1. During trials the gun showed great performance but the advent of anti-aircraft missiles at the end of the 1950s meant that the project was a dead end and no more guns were ordered. Despite this the prototype was put into service as the 12 cm luftvärnsautomatkanon 4501 (12 cm lvakan 4501) and would see service with the Swedish air defense from 1960 to 1973 before being retired.

FAK 120 technical description
The FAK 120 gun had a liquid-cooled gun barrel with exchangeable liner and a petrol-engine driven electro-hydraulic laying machinery for remote control. Hand-laying with cranks was also and option. The turret had space for two crew to aim the gun. The elevating mass was fitted with two separate magazines instead of a single one. The total ammunition capacity for both the gun and magazines was 52 shells and the automatic rate of fire was around 75 to 80 rounds per minute.

The field mount was designed to be converted to a trailer by connecting a back and front part equipped with wheels and truck mount respectively.

Bofors TAK 120 

The , most commonly known as the TAK 120, was a 1960s navalized version of the Bofors FAK 120 field gun design from 1953. The name TAK 120 means means Turret Automatic Gun 120 mm. 

The Bofors TAK 120 was a private export venture to quickly develop a modern gun system intended for large Fast Attack Craft (FAC). To achieve this Bofors decided to simply do a navalized version of their 120 mm Automatic Field Gun L/46 (FAK 120). As part of the navalization process, the TAK 120 gun was fitted into an enclosed gun turret, replacing the more open oscillating system used on the FAK 120 field gun. Due to the enclosed turret, the magazine capacity was slightly decreased. The elevation mechanism was also shifted by 5° degrees downwards to increase the maximum gun depression from -5° to -10°, but at the cost of maximum elevation, going from +85° to +80°.

The Bofors TAK 120 never saw massive success on the export market but was exported to both the Finnish Navy and Indonesian Navy and it is still in service today with the latter.

Ships fitted with the Bofors TAK 120 

 
 Turunmaa-class gunboat:
 Turunmaa (03)
 Karjala (04)

 Finnish minelayer Pohjanmaa (replaced with Bofors 57 mm Naval Automatic Gun L/70 Mk1 1996-98)

 
 Fatahillah-class corvette:
 KRI Fatahillah (361)
 KRI Malahayati (362)
 KRI Nala (363)

See also 
Bofors 120 mm Naval Automatic Gun L/50

References

Notes 

Bofors
Naval guns of Sweden
Artillery of Sweden
120 mm artillery
Military equipment introduced in the 1960s